Fear of missing out (FOMO) is the feeling of apprehension that one is either not in the know or missing out on information, events, experiences, or life decisions that could make one's life better. FOMO is also associated with a fear of regret, which may lead to concerns that one might miss an opportunity for social interaction, a novel experience, a memorable event, or a profitable investment. It is characterized by a desire to stay continually connected with what others are doing, and can be described as the fear that deciding not to participate is the wrong choice. FOMO could result from not knowing about a conversation, missing a TV show, not attending a wedding or party, or hearing that others have discovered a new restaurant. FOMO in recent years has been attributed to a number of negative psychological and behavioral symptoms.

FOMO has increased in recent times due to advancements in technology. Social networking sites create many opportunities for FOMO. While it provides opportunities for social engagement, it offers a view into an endless stream of activities in which a person is not involved. Psychological dependence on social media can lead to FOMO or even pathological internet use. FOMO is also present in video games, investing, and business marketing. The increasing popularity of the phrase has led to related linguistic and cultural variants. FOMO is associated with worsening depression and anxiety, and a lowered quality of life.

FOMO can also affect businesses. Hype and trends can lead business leaders to invest based on perceptions of what others are doing, rather than their own business strategy. This is also the idea of the bandwagon effect. Where one individual may see another person (s) do something and they begin to think it must be important because everyone is doing it. They might not even understand the meaning behind it, and they may not totally agree with it. Nevertheless, they are still going to participate because they don't want to be left out.

History 

The phenomenon was first identified in 1996 by marketing strategist Dr. Dan Herman, who conducted research for Adam Bellouch and published the first academic paper on the topic in 2000 in The Journal of Brand Management. Harmen also believes the concept has evolved to become more wide spread through mobile phone usage, texting, and social media and have helped flesh out the concept of the fear of missing out to the masses. Before the Internet, a related phenomenon, "keeping up with the Joneses'", was widely experienced. FOMO generalized and intensified this experience because so much more of people's lives became publicly documented and easily accessed. Further, a common tendency is to post about positive experiences (such as a great restaurant) rather than negative ones (such as a bad first date). Studies have found that the likelihood of experiencing fear of missing out has been linked to anxiety or depression.

Author Patrick J. McGinnis coined the term FOMO and popularized it in a 2004 op-ed in The Harbus, the magazine of Harvard Business School. The article was titled McGinnis' Two FOs: Social Theory at HBS, and also referred to another related condition, Fear of a Better Option (FOBO), and their role in the school's social life. The origin of FOMO has also been traced to the 2004 Harbus article by academic Joseph Reagle. Currently the term has been used as a hashtag on social media and has been mentioned in hundreds of news articles, from online sources like Salon to print papers like The New York Times.

Symptoms

Psychological 
Fear of missing out has been associated with a deficit in psychological needs. Self-determination theory contends that an individual's psychological satisfaction in their competence, autonomy, and relatedness consists of three basic psychological needs for human beings. Test subjects with lower levels of basic psychological satisfaction reported a higher level of FOMO. FOMO has also been linked to negative psychological effects in overall mood and general life satisfaction. A study performed on college campuses found that experiencing FOMO on a certain day led to a higher fatigue on that day specifically. Experiencing FOMO continuously throughout the semester also can lead to higher stress levels among students.  An individual with an expectation to experience the fear of missing out can also develop a lower level of self-esteem. A study by JWTIntelligence suggests that FOMO can influence the formation of long-term goals and self-perceptions. In this study, around half of the respondents stated that they are overwhelmed by the amount of information needed to stay up-to-date, and that it is impossible to not miss out on something. The process of relative deprivation creates FOMO and dissatisfaction. It reduces psychological well-being. FOMO led to negative social and emotional experiences, such as boredom and loneliness. A 2013 study found that it negatively impacts mood and life satisfaction, reduces self-esteem, and affects mindfulness. Four in ten young people reported FOMO sometimes or often. FOMO was found to be negatively correlated with age, and men were more likely than women to report it.

Behavioral 
The fear of missing out stems from a feeling of missing social connections or information. This absent feeling is then followed by a need or drive to interact socially to boost connections. The fear of missing out not only leads to negative psychological effects but also has been shown to increase negative behavioral patterns. In aims of maintaining social connections, negative habits are formed or heightened. A 2019 University of Glasgow study surveyed 467 adolescents, and found that the respondents felt societal pressure to always be available. According to John M. Grohol, founder and Editor-in-Chief of Psych Central, FOMO may lead to a constant search for new connections with others, abandoning current connections to do so. The fear of missing out derived from digital connection has been positively correlated with bad technology habits especially in youth. These negative habits included increased screen time, checking social media during school, or driving while texting. Social media use in the presence of others can be referred to as phubbing. Multiple studies have also identified a negative correlation between the hours of sleep and the scale at which individuals experience fear of missing out. A lack of sleep in college students experiencing FOMO can be attributed to the number of social interactions that occur late at night on campuses. Another study has highlighted the impact of FOMO in college students making adverse decisions with alcohol such as underage drinking, and binge-drinking.

Settings

Social media 
Fear of missing out has a positive correlation with higher levels of social media usage. Social media connects individuals and showcases the lives of others at their peak. This gives people the fear of missing out when they feel like others on social media are taking part in positive life experiences that they personally are not also experiencing. This fear of missing out related to social media has symptoms including anxiety,  loneliness, and a feeling of inadequacy compared to others. Self-esteem plays a key role in the levels a person feels when experiencing the fear of missing out, as their self worth is influenced by people they observe on social media. There are two types of anxiety; one related to genetics that is permanent, and one that is temporary. The temporary state of anxiety is the one that is more relevant to the fear of missing out, and is directly related to the individual looking at social media sites for a short period of time. This anxiety is caused by a loss of feeling of belonging through the concept of social exclusion. FOMO-sufferers may increasingly seek access to others' social lives, and consume an escalating amount of real-time information. A survey in 2012 indicated that 83% of respondents said that there is information overload in regards that there is too much to watch and read. Constant information that is available to people through social media causes the fear of missing out as people feel worse about themselves for not staying up to date with relevant information. Social media shows just exactly what people are missing out on in real time including events like parties, opportunities, and other events leading for people to fear missing out on other related future events. Another survey indicates that almost 40% of people from ages 12 through 67 indicate that social media has led to a higher feeling of the fear of missing out. Millennials are the most affected by the fear of missing out, the highest proportion compared to other generations and this is due to the prominence of social media for the generation. Social media platforms that are associated with FOMO include Snapchat, Facebook, and Instagram.

Video games 
People want to be a part of the in-group and feel like they belong, making them fear missing out on being part of the in-group. People do not want to feel like they are missing out of being part of the belonging group with respect to video games, which causes a video game addiction. When people align their social identities with the video game they are playing, they fear that not playing enough will outcast them from the group they are playing with, leading to the fear of missing out on being a dedicated member of the community.

Within video games, FOMO is also used to describe the similar anxiety around missing the ability to obtain in-game items or complete activities that are only available for a limited time, such as those in battle passes. This is particularly common for multiplayer video games, where such items are cosmetic in nature but reflect a player's skill to other players in the game and can become a sign of social standing within the game's community; wherein failure to acquire a limited cosmetic item may lead to social outcasting.

Investing 
Fear of missing out has an influential role in the investment market for cryptocurrencies. With the prominence of investors making large sums of money through cryptocurrencies, people may develop FOMO in anticipation of the next perceived get-rich-quick currency. This phenomenon has caused the rise of "pump and dump" schemes, where investors exploit FOMO to raise the price of cryptocurrencies and sell them for a profit, while lower-tier traders are not able to see profits. This has also led to the use of bots in cryptocurrency trades, as the high volatility of the cryptocurrency market can cause profits to vary rapidly even within the span of twenty seconds. Pump and dumps are a legal grey area for cryptocurrencies so it is not illegal for influencers to use fear of missing out to manipulate individuals.

The fear of missing out is also prominent in the regular stock market. Investors do not want to miss out on potential stock gains as the market is on a current upward trend as of October 2021. There is a fear of missing out on making big gains through stocks driving the market since the market was at a low point before. The fear of missing out with regards to investing is not applied evenly to different types of stocks and even within different brands of stocks in the same sector. For example, there are differences between the fear of missing out on Burberry and Prada stock in which the Prada stock is seen as more valuable and people more likely fear to miss out on buying that particular stock.

Marketing 
Advertising and marketing campaigns may also seek to intensify FOMO within various marketing strategies. Examples include AT&T's "Don't be left behind" campaign, Duracell's Powermat "Stay in charge" campaign and Heineken's "Sunrise" campaign. AT&T's "Don't be left behind" campaign used the fear of missing out to make people want to join their network and receive messages and emails at fast 4G rates, to not miss updates from friends. Duracell's Powermat "Stay in charge" campaign showcased four dead phones and advertised to the viewers that the owners of the phone were missing out on updates on the phones because they were not using Duracell's charging technologically to power the phones. Heineken's "Sunrise" campaign aimed to encourage responsible drinking by portraying excessive drinking as a way to miss the best parts of a party, rather than claiming that excessive drinking is a risk to personal health. Other brands attempt to counter FOMO, such as Nescafé's "Wake up to life" campaign. Harnessing TV viewers' FOMO is also perceived to foster higher broadcast ratings. Real-time updates about status and major social events allow for a more engaging media consumption experience and faster dissemination of information. Real-time tweets about the Super Bowl are considered to be correlated with higher TV ratings due to their appeal to FOMO and the prevalence of social media usage.

Variants

Cultural 
FOMO, as a word and as a social phenomenon, has several cultural variants. Before Americans defined FOMO, however, Singaporeans had already named their own version, "kiasu". Taken from the Chinese dialect Hokkien, kiasu translates to a fear of losing out but also encompasses any sort of competitive, stingy or selfish behavior.

Linguistic 
The term FOMO has also inspired offshoots such as FOBO, FOMOMO, MOMO, FOJI, BROMO, NEMO, SLOMO and JOMO.

 FOBO – meaning Fear of Better Options – was coined by American venture capitalist and author Patrick James McGinnis while he was a student at Harvard Business School. McGinnis describes FOBO as a byproduct of a hyper-busy, hyper-connected world in which everything seems possible, and, as a result, you are spoiled for choice.
 ROMO is a term coined during the COVID-19 pandemic that stands for Reality of Missing Out. ROMO describes the feeling of knowing that you are not missing out on anything.
 FOMOMO stands for the Fear Of the Mystery Of Missing Out. FOMOMO refers to a more extreme case of FOMO that occurs when one's mobile device is unusable, resulting in angst caused by the inability to see what one is missing out on social media. Deprived of seeing friends' social media posts, one may automatically assume that those on your social media feed are having a better time than you.
 MOMO stands for the Mystery Of Missing Out, referring to the paranoia that arises when one's friends do not post anything on social media resulting in attempts to piece together what one may be missing out on.
 FOJI stands for Fear Of Joining In and refers to the fear of posting on social media in the worry that nobody will want to connect, follow or be friends with you. FOJI is often seen as the opposite of MOMO.
 BROMO refers to instances when one's friends ("bros") protect them from missing out. An example of BROMO would be if one's friends refrained from posting pictures from their night out for fear of making anyone feel left out.
 NEMO stands for Nearly but not fully Missing Out. NEMO can refer to people who are on online networks, but do not check them frequently.
 SLOMO stands for Slow to Missing Out, and refers to the gradual feeling that one is missing out.
 JOMO stands for the Joy of Missing Out and refers to the feeling of pleasure when missing out. JOMO is a relatively positive belief that cutting off all social media and digital devices can be blissful.
 FOBIA stands for the Fear of Being Ignored Altogether and refers to the necessity of maintaining an online presence in order to feel validated as a human being.

See also 
 Hyperbolic discounting
 Keeping up with the Joneses
 Loss aversion
 Mid-life crisis
 Missed connection
 Murray's system of needs
 Opportunity cost
 Peer pressure
 Relative deprivation
 Self-determination theory
 Social influence bias
 Social media
 Status anxiety
 Social proof

References 

Advertising
Fear
Conformity
Internet culture
Social media